Giovanni Battista Bracelli (died 17 April 1590) was a Roman Catholic prelate who served as Bishop of Luni e Sarzana (1572–1590).

Biography
Giovanni Battista Bracelli was born in Genoa, Italy. On 2 June 1572, he was appointed during the papacy of Pope Gregory XIII as Bishop of Luni e Sarzana. On 4 July 1572, he was consecrated bishop by Paolo Burali d'Arezzo, Bishop of Piacenza, with Thomas Goldwell, Bishop of Saint Asaph, and Francesco Cittadini, Bishop of Castro del Lazio, serving as co-consecrators. He served as Bishop of Luni e Sarzana until his death on 17 April 1590.

See also 
Catholic Church in Italy

References

External links and additional sources
 (for Chronology of Bishops) 
 (for Chronology of Bishops) 

16th-century Italian Roman Catholic bishops
Bishops appointed by Pope Gregory XIII
1590 deaths